Michael Daniel Reid (born July 1, 1954) is an American professional golfer. Reid was one of the top amateurs in the mid-1970s, winning the 1976 Pacific Coast Amateur and leading the 1976 U.S. Open after the first round. As a professional, Reid won two PGA Tour events and finished in the top-10 70 times. In 1989, Reid came close to winning two major championships, the Masters and the PGA Championship, leading both of them during closing holes of the final round. On the Champions Tour, Reid won two senior majors, the 2005 Senior PGA Championship and the 2009 Tradition.

Early life
Reid was born in Bainbridge, Maryland, the son of an Air Force officer. He first hit a golf ball when he was five years old. Military life for his father meant that his family frequently moved from one state in America to another. Reid later said: "It wasn't much of a life for a kid growing up but it certainly helped my golf game as I played on every kind of grass there is."

Amateur career 
In 1976, Reid graduated from Brigham Young University. During his collegiate golf career, Reid was selected for All-American honors from 1973–1976. He became close friends with PGA Tour player Pat McGowan. Both Reid and McGowan developed their game under BYU's golf coach Karl Tucker.

At the 1976 U.S. Open, while still an amateur, Reid led the tournament by three strokes with an opening round of 67, before finishing tied for 50th place. Reid won the 1976 Pacific Coast Amateur at Los Angeles Country Club and lost in the quarterfinals of the 1976 U.S. Amateur. At the end of 1976 Reid was ranked the #7 amateur in the country by Golf Digest.

Professional career
Reid turned professional in late 1976, obtaining his PGA Tour card at the first attempt. He joined the PGA Tour in 1977.

In 1978, Reid lost a playoff to Mac McLendon in the Pensacola Open. In 1980, Reid finished in the top-10 thirteen times on the PGA Tour. Only Tom Watson had more top-10 finishes that year. Reid led the PGA Tour for driving accuracy in 1980 and was given the nickname "Radar" for his outstanding driving accuracy.

In 1985, Reid lost a playoff to Hal Sutton in the Southwest Golf Classic. Sutton sank a 30-foot birdie putt on the first extra hole to win the tournament.

Reid ended a wait of over a decade for his first PGA Tour title by winning the 1987 Seiko Tucson Open by four strokes.

In 1988, Reid finished 2nd at The Players Championship. Later in 1988, Reid won his second PGA Tour title by defeating Tom Watson in a playoff at the NEC World Series of Golf.

In 1989, Reid led the Masters Tournament with four holes to play but hit an approach shot into the pond at the par-5 15th hole to make a double-bogey and finished the tournament in 6th place. He also lost the lead in that year's PGA Championship on the back nine during the final round at Kemper Lakes Golf Club, bogeying the 16th hole and having a double-bogey 5 on the par-3 17th. Needing a birdie on the 18th hole to tie Payne Stewart, Reid missed a seven-foot birdie putt which would have forced a playoff with Stewart. After his final round, Jack Nicklaus approached Reid and said: "I just want to say that I've never felt so bad for anyone in my life. You played too well not to win."

In 1990, Reid was the third round leader in the KMart Greater Greensboro Open, but had three bogeys on the back nine for a round of 75, finishing in a tie for 2nd place behind the winner Steve Elkington. Later in the year, in November 1990, Reid won the Casio World Open in Japan by two strokes.

Reid missed virtually all of the 1993 PGA Tour season after sustaining a wrist injury while playing table tennis, which resulted in him having surgery to reattach a tendon.

In 1997, Reid was the third round leader in the Hawaiian Open, but lost the tournament in a three-way playoff to Paul Stankowski. In 1998, Reid shot a course record of 62 in the Westin Texas Open at La Cantera Golf Club. He finished the tournament tied for 4th place.

Reid's last top-5 finish on the PGA Tour was 5th place at the Michelob Championship at Kingsmill in 2000, at the age of 46.

Champions Tour
In 2004, Reid became eligible to play the Champions Tour and in 2005 he claimed his first senior title at the Senior PGA Championship, which is one of the senior majors. Reid won the tournament despite being three shots down with one hole to play. He forced himself into a three-way playoff with a long eagle putt on the 18th hole. After Jerry Pate missed a 3-foot par putt on the 18th to win the tournament, Reid then birdied the first extra playoff hole to win the title. Reid later said: "I feel bad for Jerry. I know how he feels because I felt that way. Fate takes a hand, and I can't explain it, but I'm grateful."

Reid did not win again on the Champions Tour until 2009 at the JELD-WEN Tradition, another major championship, in a playoff over John Cook. Reid was one shot behind Cook on the 18th tee of the final round. Reid and Cook both hit their approach shots to the par-4 18th into the right greenside bunker. Cook's bunker shot finished 20 feet away and Reid's bunker shot finished six inches from the hole. Cook missed his par putt that would have won the championship. On the first playoff hole Reid holed a 12-foot birdie putt to win the title.

Personal life
He is married to wife Randolyn and has six children. He spends his free time visiting historic sites and museums.

Amateur wins
1976 Western Athletic Conference Championship (individual), Pacific Coast Amateur

Professional wins (8)

PGA Tour wins (2)

PGA Tour playoff record (1–3)

Japan Golf Tour wins (1)

Other wins (3)
1983 Shootout at Jeremy Ranch (with Bob Goalby), Utah Open
1985 Utah Open

Champions Tour wins (2)

Champions Tour playoff record (2–0)

Results in major championships

CUT = missed the halfway cut
"T" indicates a tie for a place.

Summary

Most consecutive cuts made – 9 (1982 PGA – 1986 PGA)
Longest streak of top-10s – 1 (four times)

Results in The Players Championship

CUT = missed the halfway cut
"T" indicates a tie for a place

Senior major championships

Wins (2)

1Defeated Pate and Quigley in a sudden-death playoff.
2Defeated Cook in a sudden-death playoff with a birdie on the first hole of the playoff.

Results timeline
Results not in chronological order before 2022.

CUT = missed the halfway cut
"T" indicates a tie for a place

U.S. national team appearances
Professional
World Cup: 1980
Kirin Cup: 1988 (winners)

See also 

 Fall 1976 PGA Tour Qualifying School graduates

References

External links

American male golfers
BYU Cougars men's golfers
PGA Tour golfers
PGA Tour Champions golfers
Winners of senior major golf championships
Golfers from Maryland
Golfers from Utah
American Latter Day Saints
People from Port Deposit, Maryland
Sportspeople from Provo, Utah
1954 births
Living people